The Haunted Hotel  is a 1907 American silent short comedy film written, produced, and directed by J. Stuart Blackton. One of the oldest surviving animated films, it combines live action and stop motion to animate objects.

Plot

The film starts with an outside view of a small house, obviously a model. The windows and door start moving and the house take the shape of a face. A traveller enters the hotel and things start to move by themselves. A waiter brings the dinner and, on the table, the bread is cut by a knife moving by itself and coffee and sugar are served without human intervention.

A small figure comes out of the milk jug to pour the milk in the cup before returning to the jug. The flabbergasted guest brings out of the jug a napkin which starts dancing by itself and, when he finally catches it, it turns into a sheet. The man finally goes to bed. The room starts turning around. The film ends with a big monster appearing behind the bed and catching into his huge hands the traveler and his blanket.

Cast
Paul Panzer as The Traveller 
William V. Ranous as The Waiter

Production and reception

For the production of The Haunted Hotel, he combined various tricks such as double exposure or objects hanging from wires with the stop-motion process. Vitagraph advertised the film as "Impressive, indefinable, insoluble, positively the most marvelous film ever invented."

The film became such a hit in Europe and in the United States that it gained "a reputation as the first animated picture (...) and the most popular up to that point". The film became the best-selling American film in France and in all of Europe over 150 prints were delivered. Public response in Paris, where Vitagraph had recently opened an office, "was so strong that all the French producers racked their brains trying to figure out the tricks that made objects move by themselves. After considerable difficulty the secret was discovered and the history of cartoons could begin".

Blackton would continue the use of stop motion in The Humpty Dumpty Circus (1908) and several other short films.

References

External links

The Haunted Hotel at A Cinema History

1900s animated short films
1907 films
American animated short films
Films directed by J. Stuart Blackton
Films set in hotels
Haunted hotels
Vitagraph Studios short films
American silent short films
American black-and-white films
1900s American films